This is a list of notable individuals who have or had an association with Baldwin Wallace University, located in Berea, Ohio. Baldwin Wallace University is a private college that enjoys a long and rich affiliation with the United Methodist Church.  This includes faculty, alumni and staff.  The college is located in the greater Cleveland, Ohio area in the United States. The college and town of Berea were founded by Methodist settlers from Connecticut.

The list is drawn from faculty, alumni, staff, and former university presidents. This list includes people affiliated with the university under its past names such as Baldwin–Wallace College, Baldwin University, Baldwin Institute and German Wallace College. This list also includes alumni of the Baldwin Wallace Conservatory of Music.

Alumni

Academia
Clinton E. Adams, former medical school dean at Western University of Health Sciences; president of Rocky Vista University
Wayne G. Hammond, J.R.R. Tolkien scholar
Willis N. Holcombe, chancellor of Florida Community Colleges System; president of Broward College
William Kelso, archeologist, discoverer of the original Jamestown colony in Virginia
Drew Meyer, John Teagle Professorial Fellow in Chemistry at Case Western Reserve University
Larry Shinn, president of Berea College, Kentucky
Philip L. White, nationality scholar and political activist in Austin, Texas

Leadership and politics
Nan Baker, member of Ohio House of Representatives
Henderson H. Carson, U.S. Representative from Ohio

Genevieve R. Cline, first female United States federal judge
Mike Dovilla, member of Ohio House of Representatives
William L. Fiesinger, U.S. Representative from Ohio
George L. Forbes, Cleveland City Council President, member of Baldwin-Wallace Board of Trustees
Chester K. Gillespie, civil rights lawyer and Ohio state representative from Cleveland
Jane Edna Hunter, L.B. 1925, founder of the Phyllis Wheatley Center for the poor in Cleveland, Ohio
Jay Ford Laning, U.S. Representative from Ohio
James Lawson, civil rights leader and minister, worked alongside Martin Luther King in the Southern Baptist Leadership Conference
Charles O. Lobeck, U.S. Representative from Nebraska
Eugene Miller, former member of Ohio House of Representatives
Peter Neffenger, nominated by President Barack Obama in 2015 to lead the Transportation Security Administration
George Norris, U.S. Senator from Nebraska, creator of the Tennessee Valley Authority, creator of the Nebraska unicameral legislature, and author of the 20th Amendment to the U.S. Constitution
Miner Norton, U.S. Representative from Ohio
William Skiles, U.S. Representative from Ohio
Martin Sweeney, U.S. Representative from Ohio
Robert E. Sweeney, U.S. Representative from Ohio
Harriet G. Walker, vice president of Woman's Christian Temperance Union
Hazel Mountain Walker, L.B. 1919, among the first African-American lawyers in the state of Ohio
Amos Webber, judge; biographer of college founder John Baldwin; U.S. Representative from Ohio

Media and entertainment
 Claudia Jordan, model, actress, on CBS game show The Price is Right from 2001 to 2003, and "model #1" on the US version of Deal or No Deal
 Steven Caple Jr., film director, producer, screenwriter, most known for The Land and Creed II
 Christine Smyth, 2021 Ohio Rose contestant in the 2022 Rose of Tralee contest, who has declared she will not travel and compete if vaccination against Covid-19 is a requirement.

Music and arts

Rich Brenner, sportscaster
Khashyar Darvich, film director and producer, Dalai Lama Renaissance
Caitlin Houlahan, Broadway actress and singer
Kyle Jean-Baptiste, Broadway singer
Nancy McArthur, children's author best known for The Plant That Ate Dirty Socks
Chris McCarrell, Broadway actor
James Meena, conductor and opera administrator
Bill Moffit, marching band director, composer, inventor of the "Moffit Squares" band drill
James Montgomery, composer and Arts Administrator
Jill Paice, musical theatre actress, lead in Curtains and The Woman in White
Rebecca Pitcher, musical theatre actress, Christine in Andrew Lloyd Webber's The Phantom of the Opera
Ciara Renée, Broadway actress, singer, and musician
Kate Rockwell, Broadway actress, singer, and musician
Albert Riemenschneider (1878–1950), founder of the Baldwin-Wallace Conservatory of Music
Colton Ryan, Broadway and television actor and singer

Sports

Hank Allen, Major League Baseball player
Bud Collins, veteran CBS Sports tennis announcer
Harrison Dillard, 1947, U.S. Olympic gold medalist in 100 meter dash and hurdles; charter member of the U.S. Olympic Hall of Fame
Tim Graham, sports journalist for ESPN.com
Wynn Hawkins, Major League Baseball pitcher
Norb Hecker, first coach of the Atlanta Falcons; won 8 NFL championships as a coach of the Green Bay Packers, San Francisco 49ers, and New York Giants
Tonia Kwiatkowski, bronze and silver medalist in US Figure Skating Championships; finished 6th at the 1998 World Championships
Scott Medvin, Major League Baseball pitcher
Scott Shafer, former head coach of the Syracuse Orange football team
Jim Tressel, 2002 National Championship-winning former Coach of the Ohio State University football team; currently president of Youngstown State University
Matt Underwood, play-by-play announcer for the Cleveland Indians on SportsTime Ohio
Chuck Hayes

Other

David Ferrie, allegedly involved in John F. Kennedy's assassination
Robert F. Overmyer, NASA astronaut
T. B. Walker, businessman, lumberman, art collector
Shawn Fatholahi, Pharmaceutical Executive, Founder of MAXONA Pharmaceuticals, Inc.

Faculty
Roger Bacon, physics professor 1959–71; inventor of carbon fiber in 1958
Robert Crosser, U.S. Representative from Ohio; taught law for two years
Jane Eaglen, soprano with Metropolitan opera, professor of voice
Eric Fingerhut, director of economic development education and entrepreneurship, State Chancellor of Higher Education
John Louis Nuelsen, first (1899) to hold the Nast Theological Professorship, Bishop of the Methodist Episcopal Church
Thomas Sutton, political analyst for Cleveland's News Channel 5
Katharine Mulky Warne, music professor, composer, founder of Darius Milhaud Society

Staff and administration

Presidents

Baldwin Wallace University has had over 20 people serve as president under the school's various names of Baldwin Wallace University, Baldwin–Wallace College, Baldwin University, German Wallace College and Baldwin Institute.

Coaches
Lee Tressel, football coach and athletic director at BW, 1925–1981; inducted into the College Football Hall of Fame in 1996; father of alum and former Ohio State football coach Jim Tressel

BW football coaches

References

Baldwin-Wallace
Baldwin Wallace University people